The 2002 Africa Cup (officially called at those time "Africa Top Six") was the third edition of highest level rugby union tournament in Africa
Six teams participated to this tournament valid also as final round of African qualification for 2003 Rugby World Cup. For this reason, at the tournament participated the winner of first round, the Madadagascar.
The teams were divided in two pools, with a final between the winner of each pool.
A second division was also played

Division 1 (Africa Cup)

Regional pools

Pool South

Pool North

Finals

The aggregate results was drawn 33-33. Namibia won thanks the number of tries scored.

Division 2

See also 
 2003 Rugby World Cup – Africa qualification

References and notes 

2002
2001 rugby union tournaments for national teams
2002 in African rugby union